Faavae Faauliuli is a weightlifter from Samoa. He won Samoa's first ever gold medal at the Commonwealth Games when he successfully lifted 334 kg in the New Delhi Games in 2010. He was subsequently rewarded with US$21,000 by the Samoan Government. He subsequently competed in Glasgow.

References

Living people
Year of birth missing (living people)
Samoan male weightlifters
Weightlifters at the 2010 Commonwealth Games
Commonwealth Games gold medallists for Samoa
Commonwealth Games medallists in weightlifting
21st-century Samoan people
Medallists at the 2010 Commonwealth Games